Taga za Yug (Originally spelled in non-standardized Bulgarian orthography: Тѫга за югъ, in English "Longing for the South") is the name of a famous poem by the Bulgarian National Revival  poet Konstantin Miladinov. It is a patriotic-reflexive song in which the author, who lives in Moscow, expresses his homesickness for his homeland. By the end of the 1850s, Bulgarian poets as Miladinov started to write lyric poetry in vernacular. This poem is written specifically using the Struga dialect.

Publication

Konstantin Miladinov was educated in Athens, but later attended Moscow University (1856-60), willing to continue his studies in Slavic language instead of Greek. In Moscow, Miladinov worked on the editing of the folk songs, he was given by his brother Dimitar and his Bulgarian friends, that later both brothers published as collection called Bulgarian Folk Songs. Miladinov wrote the poem there in vernacular, specifically using his native Struga dialect.  The inspiration to write the song came after his brother, Dimitar Miladinov sent him a letter to go back to their hometown of Ohrid, where he could continue working as a teacher. The grief of Constantin for his  homeland was strengthened by his poor health. "Longing for the South" was published for the first time by Bulgarian National Revival activist Georgi Rakovski in his newspaper "Dunavski lebed" issued in Belgrade on February 7, 1861. Rakovski’s association with Miladinov was a result of their struggle for the national awakening of the Bulgarians.

Content
 

Because of the cold Moscow climate, it is these dark and dreary feelings that nurture his yearning for the warm sunshine of the South. By exclusively using positive epithets to depict the native soil, the author evokes the painful, unattainable desire to return to his homeland, symbiotically embracing it. Regarding the lyrics, he mentions several cities then in the Ottoman Empire; Stambol that is actually Istanbul, present-day Turkey, and Kukush Kilkis, present day Greece. He also mentions that he wants to see his "own places" Ohrid and Struga, present-day North Macedonia.

Modern references 
Miladinov's work is considered part of the 19th century history of the Bulgarian literature. In North Macedonia the poem is viewed as one of the most important Macedonian literary works under the name. It is traditionally recited at the opening ceremony of Struga Poetry Evenings. It is included also in the country's school textbooks. It has been translated to more than 60 languages.

In popular culture
The T'ga za Jug wine is named after Miladinov's poem. Produced in North Macedonia, the wine is semi-dry and ruby-red in color. It has been described as being similar in taste to the Italian or Californian Barbera. The rock band "Balkanski Banditi" (Balkan Bandits) with members from both Bulgaria and North Macedonia released an album with that name in 2012.

See also

 Miladinov Brothers
 Bulgarian Folk Songs
 Struga Poetry Evenings

References

External links 
The text of the poem on the Bulgarian Wikisource. 
 The text of the poem on the Macedonian Wikisource

English translation of the poem by Tala, Angelina (22 August 2012). Retrieved from the site: "Struga News" om 21.02.2020.

Bulgarian poems
Macedonian literature
1860 poems